Msoro is a town in the constituency of Malambo  in the Eastern Province of Zambia.

References

Populated places in Eastern Province, Zambia